Carposina capnarcha is a moth in the family Carposinidae. It was described by Edward Meyrick in 1938. It is found on New Guinea.

References

Carposinidae
Moths described in 1938
Moths of New Guinea